Santanu Pramanik is an Indian politician from Bharatiya Janata Party. In May 2021, he was elected as a member of the West Bengal Legislative Assembly from Khejuri (constituency). He defeated Partha Pratim Das of All India Trinamool Congress by 17,965 votes in 2021 West Bengal Assembly election.

References 

Living people
Year of birth missing (living people)
21st-century Indian politicians
People from Darjeeling district
Bharatiya Janata Party politicians from West Bengal
West Bengal MLAs 2021–2026
Members of the West Bengal Legislative Assembly